Esther Jansma (born 24 December 1958) is a Dutch writer and academic.

She was born in Amsterdam and works as an archaeologist. Jansma published her first collection of poetry Stem onder mijn bed (Voice under my Bed) in 1988. In 1990, she published Bloem, steen (Flower, Stone), which reflected her feelings after her first child died at birth.

Jansma is a professor in the Geosciences department at Utrecht University.

Selected works 
 Waaigat (Blow Hole), poetry (1993)
 Picknick op de wenteltrap (Picnic on the Winding Stairs), novel (1997)
 Hier is de tijd (Time is Here), poetry (1998), received the VSB Poetry Prize
 Dakruiters (Spires), poetry (2000), received the Hugues C. Pernath-prijs

References 

1958 births
Living people
Dutch women poets
20th-century Dutch archaeologists
Academic staff of Utrecht University
Writers from Amsterdam
University of Amsterdam alumni
Dutch women archaeologists
21st-century Dutch archaeologists